Barma, or Pama, Pamaxiang, also spelled Parma or Jarma) is a small town and township-level division in Zhongba County in the Shigatse Prefecture of the Tibet Autonomous Region of China.

See also
List of towns and villages in Tibet

References

Populated places in Shigatse
Township-level divisions of Tibet
Zhongba County